Christie Désir (born February 12, 1993) is a Haitian-American beauty queen, model and actress who was crowned as Miss Haiti in 2014 and competed at Miss Universe 2014 in the USA.

Early life
Desir was born in Brooklyn, New York and holds a BBA in Marketing and a Minor in Fashion Styling. She interned for Sean "Diddy" Combs while attending The Laboratory Institute of Merchandising (L.I.M College). After graduating she worked at Universal Music Group, Interscope Records doing Branded Content and Partnerships, creating advertisement campaigns for artists under the label. Currently, she works closely with an organization to build schools throughout Haiti.

Pageantry

Miss Haiti 2014
Previously Désir competed at Miss Haiti 2014 and placed as the 2nd Runner-up. She was designated to compete at Miss International 2014 in Tokyo.

Miss International 2014
Désir competed at Miss International 2014 but unplaced.

Miss Haiti Universe 2014
Désir was appointed as "Miss Haiti Universe 2014" by Magali Febles as national director in Haiti.

Miss Universe 2014
Désir competed at the Miss Universe 2014 pageant but Unplaced.

References

External links
Miss Haiti Universe official fan page

1989 births
Living people
Miss International 2014 delegates
Haitian female models
Haitian beauty pageant winners
Miss Universe 2014 contestants